Playing with Fire is the second studio album by American country music singer Jennifer Nettles. It was released on May 13, 2016, by Big Machine Records. This is her first album with Big Machine after parting ways with Mercury Nashville. Ten of the album's twelve tracks were written or co-written by Nettles. Produced by Dann Huff, the album also features a collaboration with singer Jennifer Lopez, titled "My House".

Background
On making the record Nettles says "The way I approached this whole project was different because I'm a different person than I was several years ago, I have different stories to tell; I have different experiences now." Nettles describes the album as "marrying traditional country styles with newer ones."

Reception

Playing with Fire debuted on the Billboard 200 at No. 10, and Top Country Albums at No. 2, selling 30,800 copies in the first week.

As of February 2017, the album has sold 99,400 copies in the US.

Track listing

Credits and personnel
Vocals
 Jennifer Nettles – vocals, backing vocals 
 Jennifer Lopez – featured vocals (12)

Instruments

 Charlie Judge – keyboards
 Matt Rollings – acoustic piano
 Jason Bonilla – programming 
 David Huff –  programming 
 Dann Huff – electric guitars, slide guitar solo (10)
 Scott Patton – electric guitars
 Derek Wells – electric guitars, electric guitar solo (1, 6)
 Ilya Toshinskiy – acoustic guitars, mandolin
 Paul Franklin – steel guitar
 Paul Bushnell – bass guitar
 Matt Chamberlain – drums
 Travis McNabb – drums

Production

 Dann Huff – producer
 Julio Reyes Copello – producer (12)
 Justin Niebank – recording (1, 2, 4, 6-11), mixing (1, 3-11)
 Jason Bonilla – recording (2), additional recording (4, 7, 8)
 Bryan Cook – recording (3, 5)
 Steve Marcantonio – recording (3, 5)
 Drew Bollman – recording assistant (1, 2, 4, 6-11), mix assistant (1, 2, 4, 6-11)
 Lance Van Dyke – recording assistant (1, 2, 4, 6-11), mix assistant (1, 2, 4, 6-11)
 Greg Foeller – recording assistant (3, 5), mix assistant (3, 5)
 Zach Hancock – additional recording (1, 2, 6, 9-11)
 Seth Morton – additional recording (1, 2, 4, 6-11)
 Adam Chagnon – additional engineer (2)
 Justin Lieberman – additional recording (3-5)
 Josh Wilson – additional recording assistant (1, 2, 6, 9-11)
 Dominic Rivelli – additional recording assistant (3-5)
 Chris Lord-Alge – mixing (2)
 Nik Karpen – mix assistant (2)
 David Huff – digital editing (1-3, 5, 6, 9-11)
 Sean Neff – digital editing (4, 7, 8)
 Adam Ayan – mastering at Gateway Mastering (Portland, Maine)
 Mike "Frog" Griffith – production coordinator
 Sandi Spika Borchetta – art direction
 Becky Reiser – art direction, graphic design
 Abby Bennett – graphic design
 Justin Ford – graphic design
 Marc Baptiste – photography
 Frankie Foye – hair stylist 
 Kristofer Buckle – make-up
 Hayley Atkin – wardrobe

Charts

Weekly charts

Year-end charts

Release history

References

2016 albums
Jennifer Nettles albums
Big Machine Records albums
Albums produced by Dann Huff